Heortia plumbatalis is a moth in the family Crambidae. It was described by Zeller in 1852. It is found in the Democratic Republic of Congo and South Africa.

References

Moths described in 1852
Odontiinae